Abbeydale is a neighbourhood in the northeast quadrant of Calgary, Alberta. It is bordered to the north by Trans-Canada Highway, to the east by Stoney Trail, to the south by Canadian National Railway tracks and to the west by 68 Street E.

Abbeydale was annexed by the City of Calgary in 1976.

Demographics

Residents in this community had a median household income of $81,232 in 2015, and there were 21% low income residents living in the neighbourhood. As of 2016, 31% of the residents were immigrants. A proportion of 1% of the buildings were condominiums or apartments, and 26% were used for renting.

Education
The community is served by Abbeydale Elementary public school and also by St. Kateri Tekakwitha Elementary School (catholic).

See also
List of neighbourhoods in Calgary

References

External links
Abbeydale Community Association

Neighbourhoods in Calgary